Cassinia longifolia, commonly known as shiny cassinia, is a species of flowering plant in the family Asteraceae and is endemic to eastern Australia. It is an erect, aromatic shrub with sticky, hairy foliage, linear or oblong to narrow lance-shaped leaves, and heads of creamy-white flowers arranged in a dense corymb.

Description
The upper surface of the leaves is glabrous, the edges curve downwards and the lower surface is covered with fine hairs.

Taxonomy and naming
Cassinia longifolia was first formally described in 1818 by Robert Brown in the Transactions of the Linnean Society of London. The specific epithet (longifolia) means "long-leaved".

Distribution and habitat
Shiny cassinia grows in forest and disturbed places, especially after fire, and often on ridges. It occurs in south-eastern New South Wales, the Australian Capital Territory and is widespread and common in eastern Victoria.

References

longifolia
Asterales of Australia
Flora of New South Wales
Taxa named by Robert Brown (botanist, born 1773)
Plants described in 1818